Boisset Collection (formally known as Boisset Family Estates) is the US office of family-owned Boisset, La Famille des Grands Vins, France's third largest wine group, and Burgundy's largest wine producer. A family-owned producer and importer of wines from France, California, Italy and Canada, Boisset Family Estates is one of the Top 25 wine producers in the United States.

The Boisset Collection is led by Jean-Charles Boisset.

Boisset Collection's wineries in North America
 Raymond Vineyards, Napa Valley
 DeLoach Vineyards, Russian River Valley
 Buena Vista Winery
 Lockwood Vineyard, Monterey
 Lyeth Estate, Sonoma
 JCB by Jean-Charles Boisset
 La Face Cachee de la Pomme, Quebec

Boisset Collection's wineries in France
 Domaine de la Vougeraie, Premeaux-Prissey, France 
 Jean-Claude Boisset, Nuits-St.-Georges, France 
 Bouchard Aine & Fils, Beaune, France 
 J. Moreau & Fils, Chablis, France 
 Mommessin, Beaujolais, France
 Louis Bouillot, Nuits-St.-Georges, France 
 Ropiteau, Meursault, France
 Fortant, Sete, France 
 Antonin Rodet, Mercurey, France

References

External links

 

Burgundy (historical region) wine producers